"We've Got It Made" is a song written by Sandy Ramos and Bob Regan, and recorded by American country music artist Lee Greenwood.  It was released in October 1990 as the second single from his album Holdin' a Good Hand.  The song reached number 14 on the Billboard Hot Country Singles & Tracks chart in January 1991.

Chart performance

References

1990 singles
Lee Greenwood songs
Songs written by Bob Regan
Capitol Records Nashville singles
Song recordings produced by Jerry Crutchfield
1990 songs